São Geraldo do Araguaia is a municipality in the state of Pará in the Northern region of Brazil.

The municipality contains the  Serra dos Martírios/Andorinhas State Park, created in 1996.
It contains the  São Geraldo do Araguaia Environmental Protection Area, created at the same time.

See also
List of municipalities in Pará

References

Municipalities in Pará